The 1975 San Jose Earthquakes season was the team's second in the North American Soccer League.  They finished 
in fifth place in the Pacific Division.

Squad
The 1975 squad

Competitions

NASL

Match results

Season 

* = ShootoutSource:

Standings

References

External links
The Year in American Soccer – 1975 | NASL
San Jose Earthquakes Game Results | Soccerstats.us
San Jose Earthquakes Rosters | nasljerseys.com

San Jose Earthquakes seasons
San Jose Earthquakes
San Jose Earthquakes
1975 in sports in California